Megalorchis is a genus of flowering plants from the orchid family, Orchidaceae.

It contains only 1 species:
Megalorchis regalis (Schltr.) H.Perrier

See also 
 List of Orchidaceae genera

References

Further reading 
Pridgeon, A.M., Cribb, P.J., Chase, M.A. & Rasmussen, F. eds. (1999). Genera Orchidacearum 1. Oxford Univ. Press.
Pridgeon, A.M., Cribb, P.J., Chase, M.A. & Rasmussen, F. eds. (2001). Genera Orchidacearum 2. Oxford Univ. Press.
Pridgeon, A.M., Cribb, P.J., Chase, M.A. & Rasmussen, F. eds. (2003). Genera Orchidacearum 3. Oxford Univ. Press
Berg Pana, H. 2005. Handbuch der Orchideen-Namen. Dictionary of Orchid Names. Dizionario dei nomi delle orchidee. Ulmer, Stuttgart

Monotypic Orchidoideae genera
Orchideae genera
Orchideae
Taxa named by Joseph Marie Henry Alfred Perrier de la Bâthie